El Bitché is the third studio album by the American band Pushmonkey, released in 2001 (see 2001 in music).

Track listing
All songs composed by Pushmonkey

"Chemical Skin" – 3:30
"Pissant" – 3:15
"Woman Named Dope" – 2:53
"Mine to Waste" – 3:56
"Myself" – 3:24
"Carbomb" – 3:34
"Thing" – 3:51
"Number One" – 3:48
"Masterbraker" – 3:47
"Diamond" – 4:06
Untitled instrumental – 1:21
"Core" – 8:20
"Tits" – 2:08

Personnel 

Tony Park – lead vocals, trumpet
Darwin Keys – drums, vocals
Will Hoffman – guitar, vocals
Pat Fogarty – bass, vocals
Howie Behrens – guitar, vocals

Pushmonkey albums
2001 albums